Mormont may refer to:

Places
 Le Mormont, Vaud, Switzerland; a hill
 Mormont, Nassogne, Luxembourg, Wallonia, Belgium; a hamlet
 Mormont, Érezée, Luxembourg, Wallonia, Belgium; a district of Érezée

People

Fictional characters
From A Song of Ice and Fire / Game of Thrones
 Jeor Mormont, Lord Commander of the Night's Watch, formerly the Lord of Bear Island
 Jorah Mormont, son of Jeor and a mercenary knight in exile
 Lyanna Mormont, niece of Jeor and head of House Mormont of Bear Island